A keyboard instrument is a musical instrument played using a keyboard, a row of levers which are pressed by the fingers. The most common of these are the piano, organ, and various electronic keyboards, including synthesizers and digital pianos. Other keyboard instruments include celestas, which are struck idiophones operated by a keyboard, and carillons, which are usually housed in bell towers or belfries of churches or municipal buildings.

This list categorizes keyboard instruments by their designs, and thus operations.

Chordophones 

 Autoharp
 Bowed clavier 
 Clavichord 
 Clavicymbalum 
 Clavinet 
 Harpsichord
 Clavicymbalum
 Lautenwerck
 Hurdy-gurdy
 Marxophone
 Piano
 Fortepiano
Tangent piano
Xenorphica
Additionally, members of the harpsichord and piano families may also use alternative setups to make the instruments more compact:

 Portable
 Folding harpsichord
 Orphica

 Spinets
 Oval spinet
 Square
 Square piano
 Virginals
 Uprights
 Clavicytherium
 Upright pianos

Aerophones 
 Accordion
 Chromatic button accordion
 Melodeon
 Piano accordion
 Calliope
 Claviola
 Concertina
 Harmonetta
 Pump organ
 Harmonium
 Regal
 Pipe organ
 Melodica

Idiophones 
 Carillon
 Celesta
 Dulcitone
 Electric piano
 Wurlitzer electric piano
 Rhodes piano
 Hohner Pianet
 Glasschord
 Keyboard glockenspiel
 Toy piano
 Terpodion

Electrophones 
 Digital piano
 Electronic keyboard
 Electronic organ
 Keytar
 Optigan
 Synthesizer

References

Keyboard instruments